The 2014–15 Big 12 men's basketball season began with practices in October 2014, followed by the start of the regular-season on November 14. Conference play is scheduled to begin on January 6, 2015, and conclude with the 2015 Big 12 men's basketball tournament, beginning March 11, 2015 at the Sprint Center in Kansas City.

Preseason

() first place votes

Pre-Season All-Big 12 Teams

Player of the Year: Juwan Staten, West Virginia
Newcomer of the Year: Bryce Dejean-Jones, Iowa State
Freshman of the Year: Cliff Alexander, Kansas & Myles Turner, Texas

Rankings

Regular season

Conference matrix

Points scored

Schedules

Baylor

|-
!colspan=9 style="background:#004834; color:#FDBB2F;" |Big 12 Regular Season

|-
! colspan=9 style="background:#004834; color:#FDBB2F;" | Big 12 tournament

Iowa State

|-
!colspan=12 style="background:#840A2C; color:#FEC938;"| Big 12 Regular Season

|-
!colspan=12 style="background:#840A2C; color:#FEC938;"| Big 12 tournament

Kansas

|-
!colspan=12 style="background:#00009C; color:red;"| Big 12 Regular Season

|-
!colspan=12 style="background:#00009C;"| Big 12 tournament

Kansas State

|-
!colspan=12 style="background:#512888; color:#FFFFFF;"| Big 12 Regular Season

|-
!colspan=12 style="background:#512888; color:#FFFFFF;"| Big 12 tournament

Oklahoma

|-
! colspan=9 style="background:#960018; color:#FFFDD0;"| Big 12 Regular Season

|-
! colspan=9 style="background:#960018; color:#FFFDD0;"| Big 12 tournament

Oklahoma State

|-
!colspan=9 style="background:#000000; color:#FF6600;"|Big 12 Regular Season

|-
!colspan=9 style="background:#000000; color:#FF6600;"| Big 12 tournament

TCU

|-
!colspan=9 style="background:#520063; color:#FFFFFF;"| Big 12 Regular Season

|-
!colspan=9 style="background:#520063; color:#FFFFFF;"| Big 12 tournament

Texas

|-
!colspan=9 style="background:#CC5500; color:white;"| Big 12 Regular Season

|-
!colspan=9 style="background:#CC5500; color:white;"| Big 12 tournament

Texas Tech

|-
!colspan=12 style="background:#CC0000; color:black;"| Big 12 Regular Season

|-
!colspan=12 style="background:#CC0000; color:black;"| Big 12 tournament

West Virginia

|-
!colspan=9 style="background:#003366; color:#FFC600;"| Big 12 Regular Season

|-
!colspan=9 style="background:#003366; color:#FFC600;"| Big 12 tournament

Honors and awards

All-Americans

All-Big 12 awards and teams

Coaches

Postseason

Big 12 tournament

  March 11–14, 2015–Big 12 Conference Basketball Tournament, Sprint Center, Kansas City, MO.

Bracket

* denotes overtime game

NCAA tournament

See also
 Big 12/SEC Challenge

References